Loweswater is a civil parish in the Borough of Allerdale in Cumbria, England.  It contains 24 listed buildings that are recorded in the National Heritage List for England.  All the listed buildings are designated at Grade II, the lowest of the three grades, which is applied to "buildings of national importance and special interest".  Most of the parish is in the Lake District National Park.  It contains the villages of Loweswater and Mockerkin, and is otherwise rural.  Almost all the listed buildings are, or originated as, farmhouses and farm buildings, the other listed buildings being private houses and associated structures, and a telephone kiosk.


Buildings

Notes and references

Notes

Citations

Sources

Lists of listed buildings in Cumbria